is a Japanese novel series written by Koji Yanagi. It has inspired a live-action film and an anime television series. This adaptation was produced by Production I.G aired from April to June 2016.

Characters

 

Played by: Yusuke Iseya
Yuuki is the founder of D-Agency, a lieutenant colonel of the Imperial Japanese Army, and a spymaster. As a spy he was named as the "Demon Lord." He is the adopted son of Viscount Arisaki, originally known as Akira Arisaki. He is good at academics, but was expelled from the military school for his cowardly tactics of fighting. This led him to open up the D-Agency, or this is what the information trail he left behind explains, but the spy who uncovers this information finds that it may all be a fabrication taken from another individual altogether.
 
Voiced by: Tomokazu Seki (Japanese); Christopher Wehkamp (English)
A man from the Imperial Japanese Army, Sakuma was sent to D-Agency to work as a liaison. He is a diligent soldier and is cautious of his surroundings. Although he personally dislikes spies, after the incident in Gordon's house, he's grown to understand them.
 

Played by: Keisuke Koide
Miyoshi is a narcissist with an arrogant nature. He often talks in a sarcastic tone. Like Kaminaga, he often works overseas. He acts bitter towards Sakuma at first because of his fixed thought about the military, but this soon changes after their first mission together.
 

Played by: Yukiyoshi Ozawa
At first glance, he gives the atmosphere of a mischievous, happy-go-lucky playboy. He has a lot of pride. Like Miyoshi, he works overseas.
 

Played by: Hiroshi Yamamoto
His real name is Tobisaki Hiroyuki. Graduated from military academy and cadet school, he is unique compared to other members of D-Agency. He was appointed as the second lieutenant. He rarely laughs and is somewhat distant to the other D-Agency members. In most visuals, he is shown to be not very good at handling alcohol.
 

One of the oldest along with Kaminaga. A man with a sociable and caring personality, he is like a big brother to the other agency members. He is a very carefree man who is good at handling women.
 

While he is said to be charming and proud, he has a cheeky personality. He is a master martial artist and is very agile.
 
Voiced by: Jun Fukuyama (Japanese); Joel McDonald (English)
Played by: Kiyohiko Shibukawa
He has a friendly personality, even to Sakuma who was antagonized by most of the members of the agency. He is soft-spoken and caring, but sometimes when he is against a hostile enemy, he shows a sadistic side.
 

He talks calmly and gives an intellectual atmosphere which makes him sound older than he looks. He has the habit of doing magic when he is thinking. In his conversation card, Amari stated that he can see how stressed Tazaki is from the amount of pigeons flying out from his coat.
 

While he is goofy and quiet in nature, he gets along with Odagiri. He can cook.
 

He is a professional at chess and is known as a good man even in missions that require no emotions.

Media

Novels
The original novel, Joker Game, published by Kadokawa Shoten on August 28, 2008, is a collection of five short stories written by Koji Yanagi. Three of them were published directly in the novel, but two of them—"Joker Game" and "Robinson"—were first published in Kadokawa Shoten mystery magazine Yasei Jidai on its November 2007 and May 2008 issues respectively. The same happened in the following novels; Double Joker, released on August 29, 2009, featured five stories that were previously serialized in Yasei Jidai, an original story—"Black Bird"–and a story that was slated to the magazine October 2009 issue. Paradise Lost, released on March 23, 2012, contained five stories published between Yasei Jidais July 2011 and March 2012 issues. Released on January 17, 2015, the four stories of Last Waltz had previously been published between Yasei Jidais September 2014 and January 2015 issues.

Manga
Kayoko Shimotsuki wrote two manga adaptations of the series. The first, adapts the first novel and debuted in Shogakukan's seinen manga magazine Weekly Big Comic Spirits on January 5, 2009. The manga was later transferred to Monthly Big Comic Spirits, where it was serialized from August 27, 2009, to May 27, 2010. Shogakukan collected its chapters in three tankōbon volumes, released from August 28, 2009, to July 30, 2010. The second manga, adapting the film, was simply titled Joker Game and serialized in Big Comic Spirits between November 17, 2014 and January 19, 2015, the same day its sole tankōbon was published.

A manga by Subaru Nitō adapting the anime was announced in the February 2016 issue of Mag Garden's Comic Garden magazine. It began its serialization in the March 2016 issue of Mag Garden's Comic Garden Magazine on February 5, 2016, which contained the first two chapters of the manga. The manga titled Joker Game the Animation has been collected into five volumes released on May 10, 2016 and March 10, 2018.

Volumes

Film
A live-action action suspense film directed by Yu Irie based on the novel was released on January 31, 2015. Starring Kazuya Kamenashi, Yūsuke Iseya and Kyoko Fukada, it was filmed during April 2014 in Singapore and in Batam, Indonesia. Irie described it as an international production since it featured British and Australian actors and only 20% of the crew was composed of Japanese people. The film's budget was partially financed by Nippon Television and it was distributed by Toho. The film earned  on its opening weekend in Japan, closing its run with  grossed. It received 225 votes (out of 677) and won the Fan Grand Prize of the Nikkan Sports Film Award. Its North American premiere was held during the Japan Cuts festival on July 9, 2015.

Anime
An anime television series was announced in the September issue of Kadokawa's Newtype magazine. The 12-episode series was produced by Production I.G, directed by Kazuya Nomura and written by Taku Kishimoto. Shirow Miwa provided the series' character designs and Kenji Kawai composed the music. The anime began airing on April 5, 2016 on AT-X, Tokyo MX, MBS, TV Aichi and BS11, finishing on June 21, 2016. The two Blu-ray disc released on July 27, 2016 and September 28, 2016, respectively, contained an original video animation each, titled Kuroneko Yoru no Bōken. QUADRANGLE performed the anime's opening theme, titled "Reason Triangle", and MAGIC OF LiFE performed the anime's ending theme, titled "Double." The anime is licensed in North America by Funimation and simulcast through the streaming website Crunchyroll.

Episode list

Reception
In 2008, Joker Game ranked second on Kono Mystery ga Sugoi! and third on Shūkan Bunshun Mystery Best 10. In 2009, Joker Game won the Yoshikawa Eiji Prize for New Writers and the Mystery Writers of Japan Award for Best Novel. The anime won the special Nogizaka46 Award given by the Newtype magazine.

References

External links
  
  at Kadokawa 
  
  at Monthly Comic Garden 
 
 

2008 Japanese novels
2009 Japanese novels
2012 Japanese novels
2015 Japanese novels
Crunchyroll anime
Funimation
Historical mystery novels
Japanese mystery novels
Kadokawa Shoten
Kadokawa Dwango franchises
Mag Garden manga
Mystery anime and manga
Political thriller anime and manga
Production I.G
Seinen manga
Shogakukan manga
Espionage in anime and manga
Spy novels
Tokyo MX original programming
Japanese mystery films